IUST may refer to: 

 International University for Science and Technology
 Iran University of Science and Technology